Capitán Av. Vidal Villagomez Toledo Airport  is an airport serving Vallegrande, a town in the Santa Cruz Department of Bolivia.

Vallegrande is within a shallow basin of the Cordillera Central mountain range. The airport is just northeast of the town, with low hills nearby to the west, and more distant in all quadrants.

See also
Transport in Bolivia
List of airports in Bolivia

References

External links 
OpenStreetMap - Vallegrande
OurAirports - Vallegrande
SkyVector - Vallegrande
Fallingrain - Vallegrande

Airports in Santa Cruz Department (Bolivia)